The men's 50 metre freestyle event at the 2018 Asian Games took place on 21 August at the Gelora Bung Karno Aquatic Stadium.

Schedule
All times are Western Indonesia Time (UTC+07:00)

Records

Results

Heats

Final

References

Men's 50 metre freestyle